ERA Productions, Inc. was a commercial studio in the 1950s and 1960s. Due to the Disney animators' strike in 1941, many animators defected eventually to ERA, such as Ed Ardal, Ward Kimball and Virgil "Vip" Partch.  The company was helmed by president Brice Mack, a background painter from Disney. The secretary was Melton Schaffer.

References 

American animation studios